Xu Xin may refer to:

Xu Xiaoxiang (1832–?), actor during the Qing dynasty
Xu Xin (Judaic scholar) (born 1949), Chinese scholar
Xu Xin (table tennis) (born 1990), Chinese table tennis player
Xu Xin (footballer) (born 1994), Chinese footballer

See also
Xu Xing (disambiguation)